Camalig, officially the Municipality of Camalig, is a 1st class municipality in the province of Albay, Philippines. According to the 2020 census, it had a population of 72,042 people. It is known for one of Bicol's finest delicacy, Pinangat.

In 1952, there was a mass conversion of certain sitios into barrios (now barangays), namely: Anoling, Binanderahan, Cabraran Pequeño, Cabangan, Ilawod, Mabugna, Magogon, Quinuartilan, Solong, and Sumlang.

Geography
According to the Philippine Statistics Authority, the municipality has a land area of  constituting  of the  total area of Albay.

Barangays
Camalig is politically subdivided into 50 barangays.

Climate

Demographics

In the 2020 census, Camalig had a population of 72,042.

Economy

Notable personalities

Domingo Samson – propagandist; Governor of Albay (1908–12) 
Justino Nuyda – zarzuela playwright and congressman

Gallery

References

External links

 [ Philippine Standard Geographic Code]

Municipalities of Albay